is a railway station on the Hachinohe Line in the town of Hashikami, Sannohe District, Aomori Prefecture, Japan. It is operated by the East Japan Railway Company (JR East).

Lines
Hashikami Station is served by the Hachinohe Line, and is 27.5 kilometers from the starting point of the line at Hachinohe Station.

Station layout
Hashikami Station has two opposed side platforms serving two tracks, connected by an footbridge with the station building. The station is unattended.

Platforms

History
Hashikami Station was opened on November 10, 1924 as a station on the Japanese Government Railways (JGR). With the privatization of Japanese National Railways (JNR, the post-war successor to the JGR) on April 1, 1987, it came under the operational control of JR East.

Surrounding area
Hashikami Station is distant from the center of the town, which is connected to the station by a bus service.

See also
 List of Railway Stations in Japan

External links

  

Railway stations in Aomori Prefecture
Hashikami, Aomori
Railway stations in Japan opened in 1924
Hachinohe Line
Stations of East Japan Railway Company